Langley Wood may refer to the following places in England:

 Langley Wood; a wood that is part of the Brent Eleigh Woods, an SSSI in Suffolk
 Langley Wood, Cambridgeshire; an SSSI
 Langley Wood, Edwardstone; a wood in the parish of Edwardstone in Suffolk
 Langley Wood, Wiltshire; part of Langley Wood and Homan's Copse, an SSSI
 Langleywood School, Berkshire

See also
 Langley (disambiguation)